The men's hammer throw at the 1988 Summer Olympics in Seoul, South Korea had an entry list of 30 competitors from 16 nations, with two qualifying groups before the final (12) took place on Monday September 26, 1988. The maximum number of athletes per nation had been set at 3 since the 1930 Olympic Congress. In the final round the eight highest-ranked competitors after three rounds qualified for the final three throws to decide the medals. The event was won by Sergey Litvinov of the Soviet Union, the nation's sixth victory in the event (second-most all-time behind the United States' seven). The Soviet team completed the medal sweep, with Yuriy Sedykh taking silver and Jüri Tamm bronze. It was the Soviets' third medal sweep in four Games, with only the boycotted 1984 Games missing. The 1988 team was the same as the 1980 squad, with Litvinov and Sedykh trading places. Litvinov and Tamm were the ninth and tenth men to earn multiple medals in the hammer throw, while Sedykh (the eighth man to do so) became the fourth to win three medals; his two golds and a silver trailed only John Flanagan's three gold medals in Olympic success.

Background

This was the 20th appearance of the event, which has been held at every Summer Olympics except 1896. Four of the 12 finalists from the 1984 Games returned: gold medalist Juha Tiainen and sixth-place finisher Harri Huhtala of Finland, and Christoph Sahner of West Germany and Matthew Mileham of Great Britain, both of whom had failed to make a legal mark in the final. Also returning were Soviets Yuriy Sedykh, Sergey Litvinov, and Jüri Tamm, who had swept the medals (in that order) in 1980 but had been kept out of the 1984 Games due to the Soviet-led boycott. Sedykh had also won gold in 1976. He and Litvinov had dominated the event since that year, with Sedykh winning two Olympic gold medals and Litvinov winning both World Championships to date (1983 and 1987). Sedykh's world record of 86.74 metres, set in 1986, still stands as of 2021. Tamm was also a serious contender; in addition to the 1980 bronze, he had finished second at the 1987 World Championship.

No nations made their debut in the event. The United States appeared for the 19th time, most of any nation, having missed only the boycotted 1980 Games.

Competition format

The competition used the two-round format introduced in 1936, with the qualifying round completely separate from the divided final. In qualifying, each athlete received three attempts; those recording a mark of at least 77.00 metres advanced to the final. If fewer than 12 athletes achieved that distance, the top 12 would advance. The results of the qualifying round were then ignored. Finalists received three throws each, with the top eight competitors receiving an additional three attempts. The best distance among those six throws counted.

Records

Prior to the competition, the existing world and Olympic records were as follows.

Sergey Litvinov broke the Olympic record with his first throw in the final, of 84.76 metres, and improved on that with his fifth throw, of 84.80 metres. All six of Litvinov's throws in the final surpassed the old record, as did four of Sedykh's five legal marks.

Schedule

All times are Korea Standard Time adjusted for daylight savings (UTC+10)

Results

Qualifying

Final

See also
 1986 Men's European Championships Hammer Throw (Stuttgart)
 1987 Men's World Championships Hammer Throw (Rome)
 1988 Hammer Throw Year Ranking
 1990 Men's European Championships Hammer Throw (Split)
 1991 Men's World Championships Hammer Throw (Tokyo)

References

External links
  Official Report
  hammerthrow.wz

H
Hammer throw at the Olympics
Men's events at the 1988 Summer Olympics